Carl de la Sablière (April 26, 1895 – died 22 October 1979) was a French sailor who competed in the 1928 Summer Olympics.

In 1928 he was a crew member of the French boat l'Aile VI which won the gold medal in the 8 metre class.

References 
 

1895 births
1979 deaths
French male sailors (sport)
Olympic medalists in sailing
Olympic gold medalists for France
Olympic sailors of France
Medalists at the 1928 Summer Olympics
Sailors at the 1928 Summer Olympics – 8 Metre